The Westinghouse J32 was a small turbojet engine developed by the Westinghouse Aviation Gas Turbine Division in the mid-1940s.

Design and development
Development of the 9.5A (military designation J32-WE-2) began in late 1942, and Westinghouse delivered the first engine to the U.S. Navy in mid-1944. The Navy selected the 9.5A to power the Gorgon II-B and III-B air-to-air missiles, but these applications did not materialize.

An improved version, the 9.5B, powered the  TD2N-1 Gorgon high-speed target drone, which successfully flew in 1945. The engine's high cost and continuing development delays led to the cancellation of the TD2N-1 program in 1946. Westinghouse manufactured 24 of the 9.5A and 20 of the 9.5B engines. Despite their limited use, they constituted the first family of small turbojet engines successfully developed and produced in the United States.

Variants
J32-WE-2Military designation of the Westinghouse 9.5A
Westinghouse 9.5A Company designation of the J32, denoting the diameter of the engine in inches
Westinghouse 9.5B Company designation for the improved version of the 9.5A

Applications
NAMU KDN-1 Gorgon high-speed target drone

Engines on display
A cutaway Westinghouse 9.5A/J32-WE-2 turbojet engine is on display at the Steven F. Udvar-Hazy Center in Chantilly, VA. This engine lacks a serial number as it was assembled from spare parts and was transferred to the Steven F. Udvar-Hazy Center from the U.S. Department of the Navy, Bureau of Aeronautics.

Specifications (9.5A)

References

Notes
 This article contains material that originally came from the placard at the Steven F. Udvar-Hazy Center.

Further reading

External links

 

1940s turbojet engines
Abandoned military aircraft engine projects of the United States
J32